National Secondary Route 157, or just Route 157 (or ) is a National Road Route of Costa Rica, located in the Guanacaste province.

Description
In Guanacaste province the route covers Nicoya canton (Nicoya, Mansión districts).

References

Highways in Costa Rica